Judo at the 2013 Asian Youth Games was held in Longjiang Gymnasium, Nanjing, China between 17 and 19 August 2013.

Medalists

Boys

Girls

Medal table

Results

Boys

55 kg
17 August

66 kg
18 August

81 kg
19 August

Girls

44 kg
17 August

52 kg
18 August

63 kg
19 August

References
Boys 55kg Results
Boys 66kg Results
Boys 81kg Results
Girls 44kg Results
Girls 52kg Results
Girls 63kg Results

External links
Results at ippon.org

2013 Asian Youth Games events
2013
Asian Youth Games
2013 Asian Youth Games